The gens Consentia was a family at Rome, which first appears toward the end of the fourth century A.D.

Members of the gens

 Consentius, a poet praised by Sidonius Apollinaris.  He married a daughter of the consul Jovianus.  He, his son, or his grandson may be the same as the grammarian Publius Consentius.
 Consentius, son of the poet, rose to high honour under Valentinian III, by whom he was named Comes Palatii and dispatched upon an important mission to Theodosius II.  He may be the same as the grammarian Publius Consentius.
 Consentius, grandson of the poet, and likewise praised by Sidonius Apollinaris, devoted himself to literary leisure and the enjoyments of a rural life.
 Publius Consentius, a Latin grammarian, and author of two treatises that are still extant.  He is generally thought to be identical with the poet Consentius, his son, or his grandson, but it is not certain which.

See also
 List of Roman gentes

References

Roman gentes